Wonders of the Solar System  is a 2010 book by the theoretical physicists Brian Cox and Andrew Cohen. The book is about the universe, cosmology as well as the Solar System, and is explained in a way that is accessible to a general reader. The book is based on a series with the same name, Wonders of the Solar System.

References 

Popular physics books
Cosmology books
2010 non-fiction books